Global Transportation Hub Authority located in Regina, Saskatchewan is one of Canada's several inland ports, along with Centre Port in Manitoba and Port Alberta in Edmonton, Alberta. As a Crown corporation of the Government of Saskatchewan, the authority is responsible for marketing, financing, planning and attracting investment for an inter-modal transfer and logistics facility in Regina.

The port consists of a 1,800-acre logistics park a few kilometers from the City of Regina, Saskatchewan.  It is situated on the Canadian Pacific mainline and near the Trans-Canada Highway and Highway 11.

As an autonomous government entity, the GTH operates much like a municipality. It is responsible for its own land-use planning and development regulations, governance structure, sub-division approvals, permitting, and enforcement services.

The Global Transportation Hub is also one of nine Foreign Trade Zone points in the country, and the only FTZ in Saskatchewan.

As of November 2017, the hub has 10 business, with most of the land empty.  The Hub Authority has been criticized for showing maps where all of the land is full.

Notable tenants at the hub include:
 Canadian Pacific Railway inter-modal facility capable of 250,000 TEU lifts annually 
 Loblaw Western Canada Distribution Centre - consisting of one-million square foot distribution facility handling  1,400 trucks per week
 Consolidated Fastfrate (CFF) intermodal and distribution facility  

The Global Transportation Hub has become the subject of controversy over its involvement in a land purchase that disproportionately benefited businessmen with personal ties to Sask Party MLA Bill Boyd.

References

External links
  Global Transportation Hub Authority

Buildings and structures in Regina, Saskatchewan
Crown corporations of Saskatchewan
Companies based in Regina, Saskatchewan
Dry ports of Canada